Benedikt Fürk (born 20 October 1988) is a German field hockey player who plays as a defender or midfielder for Uhlenhorst Mülheim and the German national team.

International career
Fürk made his debut for the senior national team in May 2010 against Poland. In November 2018, he was selected in the Germany squad for the 2018 World Cup. After the game against Malaysia he got an injury and had to withdraw from the tournament. On 28 May 2021, he was named in the squads for the 2021 EuroHockey Championship and the 2020 Summer Olympics.

Honours

Club
Uhlenhorst Mülheim
Bundesliga: 2017–18, 2018–19
Indoor Bundesliga: 2013–14, 2015–16
EuroHockey Indoor Club Cup: 2015, 2017

International
Germany
 EuroHockey Championship: 2011, 2013
Germany U21
 Junior World Cup: 2009

References

External links
 
 
 
 

1988 births
Living people
German male field hockey players
Male field hockey defenders
Male field hockey midfielders
2014 Men's Hockey World Cup players
2018 Men's Hockey World Cup players
HTC Uhlenhorst Mülheim players
Field hockey players at the 2020 Summer Olympics
Olympic field hockey players of Germany
Place of birth missing (living people)
Men's Feldhockey Bundesliga players
21st-century German people